WAER (88.3 FM) is a radio station in Syracuse, New York. It is located on the campus of Syracuse University, and is a part of the S. I. Newhouse School of Public Communications. The station features a jazz music and National Public Radio format, with a news, Syracuse Orange play-by-play, and music staff providing programming around the clock.

It is best known for its sports staff, which has produced the likes of Bob Costas, Mike Tirico, and many others. Lou Reed also hosted a free-format show on WAER during his time at Syracuse University; this free-format radio tradition at Syracuse is carried on by WERW. Other alums include Ted Koppel, Jerry Stiller and Dick Clark. The station is managed by full-time professional staff and employs as many as 50 students each semester.

History
Radio programming began on the university campus as early as 1931, the year when AM station WSYR-WMAC in Syracuse built its new transmitter site on the university campus. This station employed the WMAC call sign only when it carried Syracuse University programming originating from Crouse College. In late 1933 the call sign was changed to WSYR-WSYU, with WSYU, being used when broadcasting the university programs. In 1940, the use of dual call letters was ended, and this station became just WSYR.

On April 13, 1947, an experimental low-powered educational FM station began broadcast at 88.1 MHz as WJIV-FM, primarily as a practical workshop for SU radio students, becoming first class D educational station in the nation. After three months, a license renewal from the FCC allowed the students to change the call sign letters to WAER (W Alpha Epsilon Rho), referring to the radio honorary society). The call sign was also interpreted as Always Excellent Radio.  The studios, financial supported by General Electric, were located at Radio House, a set of prefabricated houses near the steps to Mount Olympus, immediately south of Carnegie Library. GE provided the setup, valued at 150,000  in 1948, and asked Syracuse university to experiment with this type of transmitter, in hopes of pioneering educational broadcasting by using the low-powered FM transmitters.

The enterprise was overseen by the dean of Radio department Kenneth G. Bartlett and professor Lawrence Myers Jr. served as the faculty manager. Student staff was soon appointed to create schedule of broadcast. The broadcasts included classical music, sports, news, religious programs from the Hendricks Chapel, immediate university news, student activities, as well as official university events. The station operated from 4 pm to 10 pm to avoid lecture hours.

When it began in 1947, WAER was authorized radiated power of only 2.5 Watt, but in 1951 FCC granted an increase in power to 1000 watts. The station began broadcasting seven hours a day, seven days a week, and became Syracuse University's permanent radio station. By 1984, The station ran at 6,000-watt power. The station had moved to the then newly-built Newhouse II building by the seventies.

Up until 1983, WAER was student-run, but in a controversial decision in 1983, SU took over WAER and hired full-time professionals to run operations and train students.

In 2017, a full length documentary titled "The Miracle Microphone: The Impossible History and History Makers of WAER Radio" chronicled the 70-year history of WAER. The documentary was researched and produced by Scott MacFarlane and Keith Kobland and won New York state AP Press Association award in 2019.

Formerly a component of the auxiliary services department, the station became part of the S. I. Newhouse School of Public Communications in July 2021. The station continues to be housed at Haft Hall, 795 Ostrom Ave, where it has been located since 2003.

Programming
The station programming includes jazz music, NPR programming, news, Syracuse Orange play-by-play, and special reporting projects.

Sports
The WAER sports staff is made up entirely of students, who report on home and away games. It provides daily sports updates as well as play-by-play for Syracuse University football, men's basketball, and men's lacrosse. A pregame show begins 30 minutes before each broadcast (Countdown to Kickoff, Tipoff, or Faceoff) with a halftime segment (Orange at the Half) and a postgame wrap-up (The Double Overtime). The Double Overtime, airs after every football, basketball, and lacrosse game.

Music

The music department is organized by Eric Cohen, multiple-time winner of National Jazz Programmer of the Year. Larry Hoyt is the longtime voice of Common Threads on WAER. Cora Thomas is the office supervisor and runs gospel music programming, as she maintains a Sunday morning show on WAER airing from 6-8AM.

Partnership with WERW
Since February 2010, WAER has partnered with Syracuse University's WERW 1570. WERW is a student-run, free-format station, which returned to the air in 2017 after six years of only being available through iTunes radio. The partnership has resulted in a weekly, 3-hour show, called Real College Radio on WAER, which is hosted by alternating reps of a select cohort of WERW DJs. The genre is adult album alternative (AAA), and each DJ brings their own new flavor to the WAER offerings.

Alumni

See also 
 WJPZ
 The Daily Orange
 CitrusTV
 WERW (student radio)

References

External links

NPR member stations
Radio stations established in 1947
AER
Jazz radio stations in the United States
AER
1947 establishments in New York (state)
Sports in Syracuse, New York
Syracuse University